The Hôtel Auguste-Lepoutre is a historic hôtel particulier in Roubaix, Nord, France. It was built in 1880 for Amédée Prouvost-Yon. It was rented by Auguste Lepoutre from 1902 onwards, and it was turned into a police station in 1940. It has been listed as a monument historique since 1999.

References

Roubaix
Auguste-Lepoutre
Houses completed in 1880
Monuments historiques of Nord (French department)